Carl Finney (born 1965), is a male former judoka who competed for England.

Judo career
In 1986, Finney won the gold medal in the 60kg weight category at the judo demonstration sport event as part of the 1986 Commonwealth Games.

Finney represented England and won a gold medal in the 60 kg extra-lightweight category, at the 1990 Commonwealth Games in Auckland, New Zealand.

He is a three times champion of Great Britain, winning the British Judo Championships in 1987, 1988 and 1989.

References

1965 births
English male judoka
Commonwealth Games medallists in judo
Commonwealth Games gold medallists for England
Judoka at the 1990 Commonwealth Games
Living people
Medallists at the 1990 Commonwealth Games